This is a list of lists of breweries.

By location
 List of breweries in Armenia
 List of breweries in Australia
 List of breweries in Canada
 List of breweries in British Columbia
 List of breweries, wineries, and distilleries in Manitoba
 List of breweries in Quebec
 List of breweries in England
 List of breweries in Berkshire
 List of breweries in Birmingham
 List of breweries in the Black Country
 List of breweries in Ireland
 List of breweries in The Netherlands
 List of breweries in New Zealand
 List of beers and breweries in Nigeria
 List of breweries in Scotland
 List of breweries in the United States
 List of breweries in Alabama
 List of breweries in Alaska
 List of breweries in Arizona
 List of breweries in Arkansas
 List of breweries in California
 List of breweries in San Diego County, California
 List of breweries in Colorado
 List of breweries in Connecticut
 List of breweries in Delaware
 List of breweries in Florida
 List of breweries in Georgia
 List of breweries in Hawaii
 List of breweries in Idaho
 List of breweries in Illinois
 List of breweries in Indiana
 List of breweries in Iowa
 List of breweries in Kansas
 List of breweries in Kentucky
 List of breweries in Louisiana
 List of breweries in Maine
 List of breweries in Maryland
 List of breweries in Massachusetts
 List of breweries in Michigan
 List of breweries in Minnesota
 List of breweries in Mississippi
 List of breweries in Missouri
 List of breweries in Montana
 List of breweries in Nebraska
 List of breweries in Nevada
 List of breweries in New Hampshire
 List of wineries, breweries, and distilleries in New Jersey
 List of breweries in New Mexico
 List of breweries in New York
 List of breweries in North Carolina
 List of breweries and wineries in North Dakota
 List of breweries in Ohio
 List of breweries in Oklahoma
 List of breweries in Oregon
 List of breweries in Pennsylvania
 List of breweries in Rhode Island
 List of breweries in South Carolina
 List of breweries and wineries in South Dakota
 List of breweries in Tennessee
 List of breweries in Texas
 List of breweries, wineries, and distilleries in Utah
 List of breweries in the United States Virgin Islands
 List of breweries in Virginia
 List of breweries in Washington (state)
 List of breweries in Washington, D.C.
 List of breweries in West Virginia
 List of breweries in Wisconsin
 List of brewers in Milwaukee County
 List of breweries in Wyoming

By type
 List of microbreweries
 List of fictional brewers